Checo may refer to:

People
 Checo Acosta (born 1965), Colombian folk singer
 Luis Manuel López Checo (born 1983), Dominican footballer
 Robinson Checo (born 1971), Dominican baseball pitcher
 Sergio Pérez (born 1990), Mexican racing driver, nicknamed Checo

Other uses
 Czechoslovakia, sometimes spelt Checo-Slovakia
 BG Checo International Ltd v British Columbia Hydro and Power Authority